Paddy Moclair (1 September 1907 – 9 May 1983) was an Irish Gaelic footballer who played as a full-forward and as a full-back at senior level for the Mayo county team. After retiring from Gaelic football he was a leading greyhound trainer.

Gaelic football career
Moclair joined the team during the 1930 championship and was a regular member of the starting fifteen until his retirement following the conclusion of the 1942 championship. During that time he won one All-Ireland medal, seven Connacht medals, six National League medals and one All-Time All Star Award.

Moclair experienced a fourteen-year club career with Castlebar Mitchels and Ballina Stephenites, winning nine county championship medals.

Retirement
After retiring from Gaelic football he took up the training of racing greyhounds and gained a good reputation. His training career culminated in winning the 1948 Irish Greyhound Derby with a greyhound called Western Post on 4 September 1948.

Cup
Starting in 1971, the Paddy Moclair Cup is awarded to the winners of the Mayo Senior Football Championship.

References

 

1907 births
1983 deaths
Ballina Stephenites Gaelic footballers
Castlebar Mitchels Gaelic footballers
Clerks
Connacht inter-provincial Gaelic footballers
Drinking establishment owners
Gaelic football forwards
Irish greyhound racing trainers
Mayo inter-county Gaelic footballers
People from Castlebar
Winners of one All-Ireland medal (Gaelic football)